Mo Beauty is the debut album by Clap Your Hands Say Yeah frontman Alec Ounsworth. It was released October 20, 2009, on Anti- Records. In August 2009, Ounsworth released Skin and Bones as Flashy Python.

The title is the name of shop in the Tremé section of New Orleans, a photograph of which is on the album cover.

Track listing

"Modern Girl (...With Scissors)"
"Bones in the Grave"
"Holy, Holy, Holy Moses (Song for New Orleans)"
"That Is Not My Home (After Bruegel)"
"Idiots in the Rain"
"South Philadelphia (Drug Days)"
"What Fun."
"Me and You, Watson"
"Obscene Queen Bee #2"
"When You've No Eyes"
"Dr. So and So" (iTunes only Bonus Track)
"Big Microscope" (iTunes only Bonus Track)
"Dim Wit Road" (iTunes only Bonus Track)

Personnel 

Alec Ounsworth - Vocals, Guitar
George Porter Jr. - Bass guitar
Stanton Moore – Drums
Robert Walter – Keyboards, B3 Organ
Matt Sutton – Baritone and Pedal Steel Guitars
Steve Berlin - Producer
Mark Mullins, Craig Klein, Greg Hicks, Washboard Chaz, Shannon Powell, John Boute, Al "Carnival Time" Johnson, and Meschiya Lake. - Various Instrumentation

References

2009 debut albums
Anti- (record label) albums